Tim Paterok (born 5 August 1992) is a German footballer who plays as a goalkeeper for 1. FC Saarbrücken.

References

External links
 Profile on FuPa.net

1992 births
Sportspeople from Paderborn
Footballers from North Rhine-Westphalia
21st-century German people
Living people
German footballers
Association football goalkeepers
TSG 1899 Hoffenheim II players
Wormatia Worms players
SV Rödinghausen players
VfL Osnabrück players
TSV Steinbach Haiger players
VfR Aalen players
1. FC Saarbrücken players
Regionalliga players
3. Liga players